In mathematics, Gelfond's constant, named after Aleksandr Gelfond, is , that is,  raised to the power  . This was first established by Gelfond and may now be considered as an application of the Gelfond–Schneider theorem, noting that

where  is the imaginary unit. Since  is algebraic but not rational,  is transcendental. The constant was mentioned in Hilbert's seventh problem. The related value  +  is also irrational.

Numerical value
The decimal expansion of Gelfond's constant begins

 ...

Construction 
If one defines  and

Continued fraction expansion 

This is based on the digits for the simple continued fraction:

As given by the integer sequence A058287.

Geometric property
The volume of the n-dimensional ball (or n-ball), is given by

Any even-dimensional ball has volume

and, summing up all the unit-ball volumes of even-dimension gives

Similar or related constants

Ramanujan's constant 

This is known as Ramanujan's constant. It is an application of Heegner numbers, where 163 is the Heegner number in question.

 ... 

As it was the Indian mathematician Srinivasa Ramanujan who first predicted this almost-integer number, it has been named after him, though the number was first discovered by the French mathematician Charles Hermite in 1859.

The coincidental closeness, to within 0.000 000 000 000 75 of the number  is explained by complex multiplication and the q-expansion of the j-invariant, specifically:

and,

where  is the error term,

which explains why  is 0.000 000 000 000 75 below .

(For more detail on this proof, consult the article on Heegner numbers.)

The number  

 ...

Despite this being nearly the integer 20, no explanation has been given for this fact and it is believed to be a mathematical coincidence.

The number  

 ...

It is not known whether or not this number is transcendental.

The number  
Further, no proof exists to show whether or not it is irrational.

 ...

The number  
Using the principal value of the complex logarithm,

The decimal expansion of is given by A049006:

 ...

Because of the equivalence, we can use the Gelfond-Schneider theorem to prove that the reciprocal square root of Gelfond's constant is also transcendental:

 is both algebraic (a solution to the polynomial ), and not rational, hence  is transcendental.

See also 
 Transcendental number
 Transcendental number theory, the study of questions related to transcendental numbers
 Euler's identity
 Gelfond–Schneider constant

References

Further reading
 Alan Baker and Gisbert Wüstholz, Logarithmic Forms and Diophantine Geometry, New Mathematical Monographs 9, Cambridge University Press, 2007,

External links
 Gelfond's constant at MathWorld
  A new complex power tower identity for Gelfond's constant
 Almost Integer at MathWorld

Mathematical constants
Real transcendental numbers